The Light is a self-published, monthly British conspiracy theory newspaper founded by Darren Nesbitt (frequently under the pseudonym Darren Smith) on 27 September 2020, which claims the COVID-19 pandemic was a hoax. The paper has a sister publication named The Irish Light. 

The paper has been criticised for spreading COVID-19 misinformation, antisemitic conspiracy theories and Holocaust denial. It regularly prints articles written by conspiracy theorist Vernon Coleman, and according to a review from Harvard Kennedy School "includes content that is aimed at prompting participation and activism amongst adherents of conspiracy theories, rather than simply presenting information".

The company behind the paper was dissolved on 15 February 2021; despite this, it still continues to publish.

Claims
The print publication regularly makes conspiratorial claims surrounding Bill Gates and world leaders, promotes climate change denial and claims vaccines are weaponized mind control devices.

It has called for modern-day Nuremberg trials for journalists, repeatedly referenced conspiracy theories concerning Agenda 21 and the Great Reset, and criticised the COVID-19 restrictions in the United Kingdom by comparing vaccination efforts to Nazi extermination camps. The paper was also found to have spread false claims concerning vaccines, COVID-19 and COVID-19 death figures.

The paper has printed articles by Holocaust denier John Hamer and recommended books by white supremacist Eustace Mullins. It also defended radio host Graham Hart, who was sentenced to 32 months imprisonment after making antisemitic remarks on his radio show. The paper also regularly references the far-right Cultural Marxism conspiracy theory, which has similar roots in antisemitism.

The paper has also been criticised for its support of the far-right by interviewing anti-Islam party politician Anne Marie Waters, printing articles co-authored by the English Democrats chair Robin Tilbrook and Heritage Party leader David Kurten, and promoting material by the leader of the Fascist group Patriotic Alternative Mark Collett.

In September 2022, The Light shared an article written by far-right conspiracy theorist Paul Joseph Watson claiming that Lyudmyla Denisova, the former Ombudsman for Human Rights in Ukraine, had admitted to lying about the Russian military committing rape crimes in Ukraine. The disinformation analysis group Logically found that Denisova had only accepted her use of inappropriate language in describing the rape crimes, but had not admitted to lying about said crimes.

In November 2022, The Irish Light ran a headline with the phrase 'Died Suddenly' connected to marketing efforts around the release of an independent anti-vaccine film of the same name. In this issue, the paper used the images of 42 deceased individuals, claiming they had died suddenly in Ireland due to being vaccinated. Upon investigation, none of the deaths were found to be due to vaccines and were instead found to be caused by incidents such as drowning, long-term illness, car accidents and other random events. The misuse of the names and images of the deceased individuals being used to promote anti-vaccine conspiracy theories was reported to have caused severe distress among family members of the bereaved.

Distribution
The paper is purchased via private Facebook groups and Twitter contacts and then distributed by volunteers who are instructed to airdrop copies through letterboxes or abandon the paper in public spaces. Its distributers have been criticised for deliberately targeting teenagers and children.

After copies of the paper were distributed in Stroud, residents protested against the paper, stating: "...we are alarmed by The Light's use of the pandemic to push support for antisemitism, Holocaust denial and racist hate speech - as well as for denial of climate change, NHS-bashing, and other reactionary views."

Siobhan Baillie, the MP for Stroud, called anti-vaccine misinformation "dangerous, damaging and disrespectful" and later raised concerns in Parliament, stating: "Will the secretary of state assist me in to reassure Stroud about the vaccines and encourage people not to share Covid information from unofficial sources to stop this dangerous, damaging and disrespectful behaviour."

Simon Fell, the MP for Furness, said of the paper: "This is a 'paper' set up by a conspiracy theorist who makes a pretty penny from selling t-shirts about global conspiracies. The only advice I can give people is to wash their hands after popping it in the recycling bin. Last time I looked there was no shortage of toilet roll anymore and people had stopped stockpiling. Consequently I can't imagine the demand for this will be high."

Neil O'Brien, MP for Market Harborough has also criticised the paper. After being distributed in Barrow-in-Furness, Cumbria's Director of Public Health levied a similar criticism against its contents.

References

External links
 

Antisemitism in the United Kingdom
Climate change denial
Conspiracist media
COVID-19 misinformation
Holocaust denial in the United Kingdom
National newspapers published in the United Kingdom
Newspapers established in 2020